Robert Aquino is a Pueblo-American painter from the Ohkay Owingeh (San Juan) Pueblo. He studied at the Santa Fe Indian School and has exhibited his work across the country. Some of his works are in the permanent collection of institutions including the Museum of New Mexico.

References 

20th-century American painters
20th-century indigenous painters of the Americas
Native American painters
Pueblo artists
Painters from New Mexico